Following is a list of teams on the 2020–21 World Curling Tour, which will be part of the 2020–21 curling season.

Men
As of October 30, 2020

Women
As of October 30, 2020

Mixed doubles
As of October 30, 2020

References

Teams
2020 in curling
World Curling Tour teams